Farberware is a brand which produces kitchen related appliances and cookwares. The brand was founded in New York City in 1900 and acquired by Meyer Corporation in 1997.

History

Russian immigrant Simon Farber began S. W. Farber Inc. in 1897, which manufactured gift trays and racks. The company was officially founded in 1900 and started as a match peddler located on the Lower East Side of Manhattan. It later expanded to Brooklyn, opening a plant there and inventing a clamp-on light. During the 1940s, Simon's son Isadore became the company's president, and his other son, Milton, became vice president. In 1944, the company moved to The Bronx and expanded into the manufacture of stainless steel pots and pans dubbed Farberware. During World War II, the company assisted the US government in manufacturing small arms. Milton was honored for serving as chairman of production engineering and of the Small Business Mobilization Committee. Simon's nephew, Sam Farber, joined the company after serving in the Second World War.

Milton became president after Isadore retired, and he opened a factory in Israel. The company was sold to Hanson Industries. Milton remained in his position until his retirement in 1973. In 1981 Farberware reversed its plans to move from the Bronx after New York City and State agreed to provide the company with $8 million in low-interest loans. The company has since undergone numerous name changes. In 1993, Farberware's pans were manufactured by Syratech, which contracted with All American Lighting Corporation for recoating of nonstick pans, but All American Lighting failed to process orders promptly. Meyer Corporation acquired the Farberware license in 1997, and it honors warranties for cookware it made.

In 1981, New Jersey leased Farberware's factory building, the borough's largest, to U.S. Industries, which pledged to operate for 25 years. U.S. Industries, however, sold the Farberware brand to Boston company Syratech Corporation in 1993.

In 1992, Farberware Millennium, an antiscratch antistick pan, was described as "one of the finest cookware innovations". After testing "1,000 back-and-forth scrapes by a metal spatula" the Millennium pan did not scratch.

By 1995, Farberware was among the largest producers of stainless steel cookware in the United States, reporting an "anemic annual earnings of $1 million on sales of $125 million for the fiscal year". Syratech was a $169-million company at the time and paid higher wages than those offered in China or Malaysia. Union members feared that production would be outsourced to those countries with lower wages.

Farberware products are currently found at most major retailers, including Walmart.

References

External links

Home appliance manufacturers
Kitchenware brands
Manufacturing companies established in 1900
American brands
Home appliance manufacturers of the United States